Begoña Reina López (born 14 March 1975 in Zaragoza) is an S9 swimmer from Spain.   She competed at the 1996 Summer Paralympics, winning a pair of bronze medals in the 100 meter breaststroke and the 4 x 100 meter 34 points medley relay.

References

External links 
 
 

1975 births
Living people
Spanish female breaststroke swimmers
Paralympic swimmers of Spain
Paralympic gold medalists for Spain
Paralympic bronze medalists for Spain
Paralympic medalists in swimming
Swimmers at the 1992 Summer Paralympics
Swimmers at the 1996 Summer Paralympics
Medalists at the 1992 Summer Paralympics
Medalists at the 1996 Summer Paralympics
Sportspeople from Zaragoza
S9-classified Paralympic swimmers
Medalists at the World Para Swimming Championships
20th-century Spanish women